Jigin (Note: Jigin is not a county.) Township (جىغىن يېزىسى / Jigen ) is considered to be the westernmost township of China located in Ulugqat County (Wuqia), Kizilsu Kyrgyz Autonomous Prefecture, Xinjiang Uygur Autonomous Region. The township covers an area of 1,452 square kilometers. It has four villages under its jurisdiction and its seat is at Saz Village .

History

The word Jigin comes from the Kyrgyz language, which means "get-together". It was part of the 4th Township of the 2nd district of Wuqia County in 1950 and part of Ulugqat Commune  in 1958.

Jigin Commune  was formed from Ulugqat Commune in 1962. In 1968 during the Cultural Revolution, the commune was renamed Fanxiu Commune . The original name was restored in 1980.

In 1984, the commune was reorganized as a township.

Geography
Jigin Township is located 120 kilometers west of the county seat Wuqia Town and 25 kilometers away east of Arkaxtam Port on the China–Kyrgyzstan border. It is adjacent to Ulugqat Township in the east and Oksalur Township in the south, and borders with the Kyrgyz Republic in the northwest with a boundary line of 108 kilometers.

Jigen is located between 2,700 and 5,700 meters above sea level, with an average annual temperature of 6.2 degrees and an annual precipitation of 2.2 ml. The township has 253 hectares of cultivated grassland, 870 square kilometers of natural grassland, 2,667 hectares of natural forest. There are 18 mountain passes in the township.

Politics and Government

Settlements
The township has 4 administration villages and 4  unincorporated villages under its jurisdiction.
 Saz Village (Sazi)
 Simhana Village (Simuhana) 
 Simhana is Kyrgyz for 'phone room'. Simhama is considered to be the westernmost village of China, located near Erkeshtam, Kyrgyzstan.
 Sahal  Village (Sahale)
 Hanaterak (Halatielieke)

CCP Party Secretaries
 Zhong Zi'ou, 2017

Demographics

, the population of Jigin was 99.6% Kyrgyz.

Notable people
Burumahan Maoleduo, wife in a herding family and on-foot border guard of fifty years

See also
 China–Kyrgyzstan border
 List of extreme points of China

References 

Township-level divisions of Wuqia County